Zhubao railway station is a freight-only railway station in Lanshan District, Linyi, Shandong, China. It is on the Yanzhou–Shijiusuo railway and is the eastern terminus of the Zaozhuang–Linyi railway.

History
Construction on a new freight terminal began in October 2016. The first phase of the expanded terminal was put into use in 2018.

References

Railway stations in Shandong